Gasoline Gus is a 1921 American comedy film directed by James Cruze and starring Fatty Arbuckle. Prints of Gasoline Gus held at the Gosfilmofond archive in Russia and Cinematheque Belgique.

Cast
 Roscoe 'Fatty' Arbuckle as Gasoline Gus
 Lila Lee as Sal Jo Banty
 Charles Ogle as Nate Newberry
 Theodore Lorch as Dry Check Charlie
 Wilton Taylor as Judge Shortridge
 Knute Erickson as 'Scrap Iron' Swenson
 Fred Huntley

Other media

Gasoline Gus is an early 20th century popular culture figure who also appeared in cartoon strips and a record single, both of which precede the film. The comic strip was written by O.P. Williams and was syndicated by the Philadelphia North American between 1913 and 1914. Gasoline Gus was a taxi driver and car fanatic who constantly wrecked his early automobile. Billy Murray and the American Quartet recorded the song "Gasoline Gus and his Jitney Bus" in 1915.

The petroleum scientist and Director of Universal Oil Products, Gustav Erloff, was nicknamed Gasoline Gus from 1915.

See also
 Fatty Arbuckle filmography

References

External links

1921 films
1921 comedy films
1921 short films
American silent short films
American black-and-white films
Silent American comedy films
Films directed by James Cruze
American comedy short films
1920s American films